Morpheus  ('Fashioner', derived from the  meaning 'form, shape') is a god associated with sleep and dreams. In Ovid's Metamorphoses he is the son of Somnus and appears in dreams in human form. From the Middle Ages, the name began to stand more generally for the god of dreams, or of sleep.

Ovid
In Ovid's Metamorphoses, Morpheus is one of the thousand sons of Somnus (Sleep). His name derives from the Greek word for form (μορφή), and his function was to appear in dreams in human guise.  According to Ovid "no other is more skilled than he in representing the gait, the features, and the speech of men; the clothing also and the accustomed words of each he represents." Like other gods associated with sleep, Ovid makes Morpheus winged.

Ovid called Morpheus and his brothers, the other sons of Somnus, the Somnia ("dream shapes"), saying that they appear in dreams "mimicking many forms". Ovid gives names to two more of these sons of Sleep. One called Icelos ('Like'), by the gods, but Phobetor ('Frightener') by men, "takes the form of beast or bird or the long serpent", and Phantasos ('Fantasy'), who "puts on deceptive shapes of earth, rocks, water, trees, all lifeless things".

The three brothers' names are found nowhere earlier than Ovid, and are perhaps Ovidian inventions. Tripp calls these three figures "literary, not mythical concepts". However, Griffin suggests that this division of dream forms between Morpheus and his brothers, possibly including their names, may have been of Hellenistic origin.

Gallery

Namesake 
 Friedrich Sertürner derived the name of the opiate drug morphine from the name of Morpheus.
 4197 Morpheus, an Apollo asteroid and near-Earth object
 Morpheus, a character of The Matrix franchise
Morpheus, character from The Sandman by Neil Gaiman

See also

References

Sources
 .
 Grimal, Pierre, The Dictionary of Classical Mythology, Wiley-Blackwell, 1996, .
 .
 Ovid. Metamorphoses, Volume II: Books 9-15. Translated by Frank Justus Miller. Revised by G. P. Goold. Loeb Classical Library No. 43. Cambridge, Massachusetts: Harvard University Press, 1916. Online version at Harvard University Press.
 

Dreams in religion
Roman gods
Sleep deities

id:Oneiroi#Morfeus